Dmitry Igorevich Suranovich (born 27 June 1995 in Minsk) is a retired professional racing driver from Belarus, who has Russian citizenship and races under a Russian racing licence.

Career

Karting
Suranovich began karting in 2008 and raced in various international series, working his way up from the junior ranks to progress through to the KF3 and KF2 category by 2011. He was a champion in Russian KF3 and KF2 championships in 2009 and 2010 respectively.

Formula Abarth
In 2011 just after reaching 16 years old, Suranovich graduated to single–seaters, racing in the Formula Abarth for Euronova Racing by Fortec joining compatriot Sergey Sirotkin. He made his début at Red Bull Ring with four rounds to spare, finishing in both Italian and European Series standings with just a single point.

Toyota Racing Series
In 2012 Suranovich joined Victory Motor Racing for participation in Toyota Racing Series At Timaru he scored his first podium, finishing on second place.

GP3 Series
Also in 2012 Suranovich will make his debut in GP3 Series with Marussia Manor Racing. He was excluded from the second race in Monaco for ignoring black and orange flags and then causing a major collision with Conor Daly.

European Formula Three
For 2013, Suranovich made his debut in European Formula Three with Fortec alongside Britain's Josh Hill, Brazil's Pipo Derani and Puerto Rico's Félix Serrallés. After the first round in Monza, Suranovich began having money trouble and could not continue to compete and pulled out of the second round at Silverstone.

Retirement
Suranovich officially retired from racing, aged 17.

Personal life
His father is Igor Suranovich, a famous former Belarusian fencer. Dmitry also enjoys archery and tennis. In 2017, he got a degree in Numerical Analysis.

Racing record

Career summary

Complete GP3 Series results
(key) (Races in bold indicate pole position) (Races in italics indicate fastest lap)

References

External links
 

1995 births
Living people
Sportspeople from Minsk
Russian racing drivers
Formula Abarth drivers
Toyota Racing Series drivers
Russian GP3 Series drivers
FIA Formula 3 European Championship drivers
Manor Motorsport drivers
Euronova Racing drivers
Fortec Motorsport drivers
Hitech Grand Prix drivers